Ovingdean Hall School (OHS) was a special day and boarding secondary school for the severely and profoundly deaf children and young people including those with additional special needs. It closed in July 2010.

The former school's site is in a rural setting in the village of Ovingdean, near Brighton, East Sussex.

Many deaf and hard of hearing children attendeded the school from all over the UK and sometimes from other English-speaking nations.

It was constituted as a registered charity under English law.

Patrons 
Veteran British actress, Dame Judi Dench, and the former British Olympic champion, Sally Gunnell, were patrons of the school.

Dench once sent a special filmed message from a James Bond film set during the opening of the school's newly refurbished drama hall.

Brief history 
He built Ovingdean House there during 1792 at the cost of £2653-10s-0d (approx). The house was later home of stained glass artist Charles Eamer Kempe (1837–1907) and Thomas Read Kemp (1783–1844), the founder of Kemp Town in Brighton.

In 1891, Ovingdean House became a young gentlemen's school, which by that time was renamed Ovingdean Hall. Several extra school buildings were built by 1897. In 1941 the school moved to Devon during World War II, and the Canadian Army took over the Ovingdean site.

By the end of the war in 1945, it was sold to the Brighton Institution for the Deaf and Dumb school and in 1947 was reopened as a school that continued until the summer of 2010 as Ovingdean Hall School for the hearing impaired children from 11 to 19yrs.

During 2008, the Hastings-based film company Toaster Productions has produced a special DVD documentary film entirely about the school and its pupils, entitled "Ovingdean Hall School: A very special special school". During the millennium, a short film about the school was also produced.

The school Governing Body had two former pupils of the school as Trustee Governors (from 2005 until its dissolution in 2010).

In August 2009, the Ovingdean Hall Reunion Association (see link below) held a (belated) 60th Anniversary Grand Reunion at the school, to celebrate the first 60 years of Ovingdean Hall School. Over 500 ex-pupils and their friends attended.

This was followed with a final Farewell reunion in July 2010, as pupils learnt of the impending school closure. Over 600 ex-pupils and their friends came to see their alma mater for the last time.

The school closed its doors for the final time at the end of the school year in July 2010 after declining pupil numbers meant it was no longer financially viable.

The school and its grounds were put up for sale on the open market by the Trustees.

The Trust will continue in its work after the school has closed and will use the monies from the sale to benefit young deaf learners in line with the existing aims of the charity.

The former school site was sold off and became Ovingdean Hall International Language College (OHC). OHC closed in 2015. The sites current use is unknown.

In July 2012, the old school trust became Ovingdean Hall Foundation - a charity and grant-making organisation committed to supporting education projects for deaf young people. The Foundation works in partnership with two other deaf organisations: the Ewing Foundation and Burwood Park Foundation.

See also
 Grade II listed buildings in Brighton and Hove: N–O

References

External links 
 
 Ovingdean Hall School
 Ovingdean Hall Reunion Association

Grade II listed buildings in Brighton and Hove
Schools for the deaf in the United Kingdom
Educational charities based in the United Kingdom
Educational institutions established in 1891
1891 establishments in England
Defunct schools in Brighton and Hove
Educational institutions disestablished in 2010
2010 disestablishments in England
Deafness charities
Defunct special schools in England